Lischkeia is a genus of sea snails, marine gastropod molluscs in the family Eucyclidae.

Species
Species within the genus Lischkeia include:
 Lischkeia alicei (Dautzenberg & Fischer, 1896)
 Lischkeia alwinae (Lischke, 1871)
 Lischkeia imperialis (Dall, 1881)
 Lischkeia mahajangaensis Vilvens, 2002
 Lischkeia miranda (Locard, 1897)
 Lischkeia reginamaris Habe & Okutani, 1981
 Lischkeia undosa Kuroda & Kawamura, 1956
Species brought into synonymy
 Lischkeia argenteonitens (Lischke, 1872): synonym of Ginebis argenteonitens (Lischke, 1872)
 Lischkeia cidaris (Carpenter, 1864): synonym of Cidarina cidaris (Carpenter, 1864)
 Lischkeia convexiuscula (Yokoyama, 1920): synonym of Ginebis argenteonitens (Lischke, 1872)
 Lischkeia crumpii (Pilsbry, 1893): synonym of Ginebis crumpii (Pilsbry, 1893)
 Lischkeia deichmannae F. M. Bayer, 1971: synonym of Lischkeia imperialis (Dall, 1881)
 Lischkeia ottoi (Philippi, 1844): synonym of Calliotropis ottoi (Philippi, 1844)
 Lischkeia regalis (Verrill & Smith, 1880): synonym of Calliotropis regalis (Verrill & Smith, 1880)

References

 Quinn J.F. Jr (1979). Biological results of the University of Miami deep-sea expeditions. 130. The systematics & zoogeography of the gastropod family Trochidae collected in the Straits of Florida & its approaches. Malacologia, 19(1): 1-62
 Gofas, S.; Le Renard, J.; Bouchet, P. (2001). Mollusca, in: Costello, M.J. et al. (Ed.) (2001). European register of marine species: a check-list of the marine species in Europe and a bibliography of guides to their identification. Collection Patrimoines Naturels, 50: pp. 180–213
 Williams S.T., Karube S. & Ozawa T. (2008) Molecular systematics of Vetigastropoda: Trochidae, Turbinidae and Trochoidea redefined. Zoologica Scripta 37: 483–506

 
Eucyclidae